Tony Nikolakopoulos is a Greek Australian film and television actor. He is best known for his work in the films of Nick Giannopoulos, The Wog Boy and The Wannabes, and for his role as Attilio in the television series Scooter: Secret Agent.  He has also performed in stage plays, including Cafe Rebetika in 2009.

Select filmography

Television 
 Here Come the Habibs (2016–2017)
 Wentworth (2014, 2015)
 Fat Tony & Co. (2014) Stavros Makrakanis
 The Doctor Blake Mysteries (2013)
 Tangle (2009)
 Underbelly (2008)
 Kick (2007)
 Little Oberon (2005)
 Scooter: Secret Agent (2005)
 Alice (2003)
 White Collar Blue (2002)
 Stingers (1999, 2003)
 Blue Heelers (1997, 2002)
 SeaChange (1998)

Film 
 Joe Cinque's Consolation (2016)
 Alex & Eve (2015) as George, Greek father of Alex.
 Predestination (2014)
 Big Mamma's Boy (2011)
 "Wog Boy 2: The Kings of Mykonos" (2010)
 The Independent (2007)
 Forged (2006)
 The Extra (2005)
 The Drop (2005)
 The Wannabes (2003)
   Kangaroo Jack (2003)
 The Wog Boy (2000)
 Head On (1998)
 Life (1996)
 Predestination (2014)

References

External links 

Living people
Australian male film actors
Australian male stage actors
Australian male television actors
Australian people of Greek descent
Male actors from Melbourne
Year of birth missing (living people)
20th-century Australian male actors
21st-century Australian male actors